In general usage, de novo (literally 'of new') is a Latin expression used in English to mean 'from the beginning', 'anew'.

De novo may also refer to:

Science and computers
 De novo mutation, a new germline mutation not inherited from either parent
 De novo protein design, the creation of a protein sequence that is not based on existing, natural sequences
 De novo protein structure prediction, the prediction of a protein's 3D structure, based only on its sequence
 De novo synthesis of complex molecules from simple molecules in chemistry
 De novo transcriptome assembly, the method of creating a transcriptome without a reference genome, using de novo sequence assembly
De novo gene birth, the emergence of genes from non-coding sequence
 De novo assembly in genomics
 De Novo classification, a pathway to classify new medical devices provided by the US Federal Food, Drug, and Cosmetic Act
 Denovo, a supercomputer project that simulates nuclear reactions; see

Other
 De novo review, an appellate standard of review for legal issues
 Trial de novo, or a new trial in the legal system
 De novo bank, a state bank that has been in operation for five years or less
 De Novo, a public housing estate in Kai Tak, Hong Kong
 Denovo (band), a 1980s Italian new wave group

Latin words and phrases